The Hochfirst Ski Jump (German: Hochfirstschanze) is a ski jumping hill located in Titisee-Neustadt in the state of Baden-Württemberg in Germany. The ski jump is named after the mountain Hochfirst (1197 m) in the Black Forest. It is the biggest natural ski jumping hill. This means that in contrast to many other ski jumping facilities, rather than an artificial tower, the natural gradient of the mountain slope was used for construction.

History 
In 1911, the first ski jumping hill at Neustadt in the Black Forest was built at the Mühlrain. From 1930 to 1932, the first Hochfirstschanze in Schmiedsbachtal was constructed as a 60 meter hill. It was inaugurated on December 31, 1933 in front of an attendance of 3,000 spectators. 10,000 spectators came to the hill during the Wehrmacht Championships in February 1938.

After World War II, the Ski Club Neustadt developed the idea to build a new large hill together with the ski jumpers Toni Brutscher, Sepp Weiler and Heini Klopfer from Oberstdorf. The natural K80 hill was planned by Heini Klopfer and constructed next to the old hill from August to December 1949. The Hochfirstschanze could be inaugurated on 1950-01-15, where 15,000 spectators could watch jumps of up to 95 meters.

The take-off area of the large hill was modified in 1971 and the hill was extended with a k-spot of 90 m, later 101 m. Furthermore, a bend in the inrun was straightened in 1971. In 1976, German Nationals were again held in Titisee-Neustadt and since 1978 competitions of Schwarzwälder Springertournee were held there, which later became part of Europe Cup and Continental Cup. A profound conversion of the landing hill and modifications to the take-off were carried out in 1987-88, enlarging the critical point to 113 m.

Next to the former 60-meter-hill, the Fritz-Heitzmann-K40 junior hill was reconstructed and covered with plastic mattings in 1993.

In 2000, almost 4 Mio. Euro were invested in order to modernize Hochfirstschanze as a World Cup-ready K120 ski jump. After a Continental Cup competition for the inauguration on February 10 and 11, 2001, the first Ski Jumping World Cup event in the Black Forest was hosted in December 2001. In 2003-2004, the hill profile was slightly changed from K120 to K125 (HS 142). The Hochfirstschanze has since been regular host of Ski Jumping World Cup and Continental Cup competitions, although the organizers often had to fight lack of snow and difficult weather conditions.

International contests 
The following list includes all jumping competitions organized by the FIS:

Photo gallery

See also 

 FIS Ski Flying World Cup
 List of ski jumping hills

References

Ski jumping venues in Germany
Black Forest
Buildings and structures in Breisgau-Hochschwarzwald
Sports venues in Baden-Württemberg
Sports venues completed in 1950
1950 establishments in West Germany